Dams and reservoirs in Nigeria are used for irrigation, water supply, hydro - electric power generation or a combination of these. They are of particular importance in the northern part of the country, where there is low rainfall. 

]

The Niger Dams Project, is a series of three dams and reservoirs built in the second half of the 20th century in Kwara, Niger, and Kebbi states, northwestern Nigeria, on the Niger and Kaduna rivers. The first of the dams was built at Kainji in 1969. Its reservoir, Kainji Lake, supports irrigation and fishing projects in the states in which it lies. On its western shore, Lake Kainji National Park, including the Borgu and Zugurma game reserves, has promoted the tourism industry. The dam and hydroelectric power plant at Jebba,  from the Kainji Dam, were completed in 1984, and the dam at Shiroro Gorge on the Kaduna River, west of Bida in Niger state, began operations in 1990.

The study revealed that there are 323 large, medium and small dams, which have been constructed and are being operational in Nigeria. They have a total storage capacity of more than 30×109 m3. Eighty-five percent of the larger dams are located in the Sudano-Sahelian zone of the country.

Seventy-nine percent have domestic and industrial water supply components, while 33% have irrigation as a major use to which the stored water is put; 29% are for fisheries, 16% for recreation and 4% are also for hydro-electric power generation (HEP). The three largest hydropower dams are under operation and control the flow of the Niger and Kaduna rivers. Dams in Nigeria can be classified into various categories, such as structure, age, purpose, etc. The common dams are small dams to be followed by medium dams with very few large dams. This can be attributed to their cost, demand and availability of land. The order of location of dams in Nigeria based on the district is north west, north east, north central, south west, south east and south. Some of these dams have failed (operational, functional and structural) in the past years due to lack of proper maintenance. It was concluded that citing of dams in Nigeria is based on many factors, such as land availability, purpose, water need, ecological factors and government policy.

The table below shows some of the large dams in the country.

References

Sources

Nigeria
Economy of Nigeria-related lists

Lists of landforms of Nigeria
Lists of buildings and structures in Nigeria